Dmitri Vornişel (born 2 February 1990, Tiraspol, Moldavian SSR) is a Moldavian football striker who plays for club Iskra-Stal.

External links
Profile at FC Iskra-Stal official site 

1990 births
Living people
People from Tiraspol
Moldovan footballers
Association football forwards
FC Tiraspol players